Mela is a Ugandan web television series created and directed by Nana Kagga. It stars Malaika in the lead and her debut acting role  as Mela Katende while Daniel Omara, Cleopatra Koheirwe, Lesham Kenogo, Denis Kinani and Marie Corrazon joined in supporting and regular roles. The series was entirely produced at Savannah MOON by producers and sisters Meme and Nana Kagga, who also co-executive produced the series. Nana co-directed the series with Marie Corrazon.

The series premiered in 2018 at a red carpet event at the Savannah MOON headquarters in Kampala. The series was later picked up by Vision Group for their Urban TV network in October 2019. Season 1 started airing on Urban TV on December 1, 2019.

Plot
Mela Katende, an illegitimate child is raised by her step mother, struggles to live up to the expectations of her family, society and culture.

Cast

References

External links
 Mela - Trailer
 

Ugandan drama television series
2019 Ugandan television series debuts
2010s Ugandan television series